The 2018 Kobe Challenger was a professional tennis tournament played on indoor hard courts. It was the 4th edition of the tournament which was part of the 2018 ATP Challenger Tour. It took place in Kobe, Japan between 12 and 18 November 2018.

Singles main-draw entrants

Seeds

 1 Rankings are as of 5 November 2018.

Other entrants
The following players received wildcards into the singles main draw:
  Hiroyasu Ehara
  Shinji Hazawa
  Shuichi Sekiguchi
  Kaito Uesugi

The following players received entry from the qualifying draw:
  Andrew Harris
  Colin Sinclair
  Aleksandar Vukic
  Wu Tung-lin

The following player received entry as a lucky loser:
  Lý Hoàng Nam

Champions

Singles

 Tatsuma Ito def.  Yosuke Watanuki 3–6, 7–5, 6–3.

Doubles

 Gonçalo Oliveira /  Akira Santillan def.  Li Zhe /  Go Soeda 2–6, 6–4, [12–10].

External links
Official Website

2018 ATP Challenger Tour
2018
2018 in Japanese tennis